Ferrar Fenton, M.R.A.S. (1832-1920) was a London businessman, a manufacturer, and financial organizer. He is perhaps most well known for his translation of The Bible in Modern English, which is commonly referred to as the Ferrar Fenton Bible. Fenton made translation of the Bible a lifetime avocation, spending approximately fifty years working on his translation, with the goal "to study the Bible absolutely in its original languages, to ascertain what its writers actually said and thought."

Early life and career 
Ferrar Fenton was born in 1832 in Waltham, Lincolnshire, England. Initially educated by his father, R. C. Fenton, he then attended private school. Fenton's parents originally wanted him to go into ministry, but he lost interest in spiritual matters by age 20.

Following a university education, he began working in a factory, eventually becoming manager. He became involved in the diamond business in South Africa and eventually became head of DeBeers.  While sources vary on the timing, at one point in his life a dishonest lawyer caused him to lose his fortune but he was able to recover and become successful again.

In 1902, he was elected to membership in the Royal Asiatic Society.

Bible translation 
Fenton was a Church of England Layman. It is said that he had knowledge of 25 Oriental and modern languages and dialects, including ancient Sanskrit, Greek, Hebrew and Latin. As a tradesman, he also had access to numerous ancient Septuagint and Masoretic manuscripts to aid in translation. He also used a Polyglot Bible for minimal referencing.

Fenton viewed his career in business as background for his Bible translation work, saying, "I hold my commercial experience to have been my most important field of education, divinely prepared to fit me to be a competent translator of the Bible, for it taught me what men are, and upon what motives they act, and by what influences they are controlled."  According to Derek Wilson in The People's Bible, "Fenton set himself single-handedly to challenge the Darwinians and the higher critics and also to produce a new masterpiece in the English language which would replace the long-esteemed King James Version."

Fenton believed that unless a modern English version of the Bible were produced, the Christian faith would be lost and so he began work on his own translation in 1853. For the next 40 years, he only ever read his New Testament in Greek to avoid being influenced by previous translators. He first released a modern version of Romans in 1882 followed by his translation of Paul's epistles in 1883. Other parts of the Bible followed,  until the complete Bible was published in 1903, with revisions published until 1910.

His complete Bible continues to remain in print, and is currently published by Destiny Publishers. For some, Fenton's objective of replacing the King James Bible would seem to be a success. The Cambridge History of the Bible, while referring to his translation as "sometimes erroneous and amateurish," suggests that the value of his work is in keeping the idea of modern language translation alive.

Works 
 Connection of the Welsh and Oriental Languages
 Seven Years of an Indian Officer's Life
 Plassey, an Ode
 Poems from the Persian
 Memoirs of G. Tresham Gregg, D.D., the Orientalist Rector of St. Patrick's, Dublin
 When I Served with General Gordon
 Life of Richard Fenton, K.C., F.A.S., the Historian
 Life of John Fenton, the Archaeologist
 St. Paul's Epistles in Modern English
 The New Testament in Modern English
 The Book of Job in Modern English and the Original Metre
 The Five Books of Moses, Direct from the Hebrew, in Modern English
 The Books of the Prophets in the Original Verse or Prose
 The Psalms and Sacred Writers
 Complete Holy Bible in Modern English, with Critical Notes
 The Bible and Wine - 1911
 The Command of the Ever-Living ... God's Law of Life with the Interpretation of the Prophets

References 

British Israelism